Soulpepper is a theater company based in Toronto, Ontario. It is the largest non-profit theater in the city.

History
Soulpepper was founded in 1998 by twelve Toronto artists aiming to produce lesser-known theatrical classics.  Soulpepper has since become an important part of Toronto's theater scene. It often presents Canadian interpretations of works by noted playwrights such as Harold Pinter, Thornton Wilder, Samuel Beckett, Tom Stoppard and Anton Chekhov.

Soulpepper's founding members are Martha Burns, Susan Coyne, Ted Dykstra, Michael Hanrahan, Stuart Hughes, Diana Leblanc, Diego Matamoros, Nancy Palk, Albert Schultz, Robyn Stevan, William Webster, and Joseph Ziegler

In 2005, the Soulpepper Theater Company moved into its permanent building, the Young Centre for the Performing Arts. The joint project with the George Brown College theater school was designed by local firm KPMB Architects and is located in Toronto's historic Distillery District.

In January 2018, founding artistic director Albert Schultz was publicly accused of sexual misconduct by four professional actresses who worked with him at Soulpepper. The women involved are Kristin Booth, Diana Bentley, Hannah Miller and Patricia Fagan. Lawsuits on their behalf were filed against both Schultz and Soulpepper. Schultz resigned his position as artistic director on January 4, 2018. The lawsuits were settled out of court in July 2018.

The Academy

Soulpepper's goal is to play a significant role in the development of future generations of theater artists through the Soulpepper Academy. This full-time, paid training program was launched in 2006. Selected through a nationwide search, 8 artists undertake a one-year residency to further develop their skills under the guidance of leading theater practitioners, further their careers through involvement in Soulpepper productions, teach in the classrooms of the local community, mentor youth and develop a collective creation.

The Soulpepper Academy program is divided into two phases. The first is focused on training and pedagogy, while the second shifts to performance/production with ongoing training. The Academy was on hold and under review in 2018, but has since resumed.

Awards

Dora Mavor Moore Awards
Parfumerie: Outstanding Production (2010)
Parfumerie; Outstanding Direction of a Play/Musical, Morris Panych (2010)
Parfumerie; Outstanding Original Set Design, Ken MacDonald (2010)
Who's Afraid of Virginia Woolf?; Outstanding Performance by a Male in a Principal Role, Diego Matamoros (2010)
A Raisin in the Sun; Outstanding Performance in a Leading Role, Alison Sealy-Smith (2009)
Top Girls: Outstanding Direction of a Play, Alisa Palmer (2008)
The Time of Your Life: Outstanding Performance in a Leading Role, Joseph Ziegler (2008)
The Time of Your Life: Outstanding Performance in a Featured Role, Stuart Hughes (2008)
Leaving Home: Outstanding Performance in a Featured Role, Jane Spidell (2007)
Our Town: Outstanding Production of a Play (2006)
Translations: Outstanding Performance in a Featured Role, Michael Simpson (2005)
No Man's Land: Outstanding Performance, William Hutt (2003)
The Bald Soprano/The Lesson: Outstanding Direction of a Play, Jim Warren (2001)
Platonov: Best Production; Outstanding Performance, Diego Matamoros (2000)
Platonov: Outstanding Direction of a Play, László Marton (1999)
Endgame: Best Production; Outstanding Sound Design, Richard Feren (1999)

Other awards
2015 - Premier's Awards for Excellence in the Arts, Arts Organization Award
2008 - DareArts Foundation Cultural Award to Albert Schultz, in recognition of his outstanding work in empowering and educating at-risk youth
2006 - Toronto Arts Council Foundation William Kilbourn Award to Albert Schultz, for contribution to the cultural life of the city
2006 - City of Toronto Barbara Hamilton Memorial Award to Albert Schultz, recognizing excellence and professionalism in the performing arts
2005 - City of Toronto Barbara Hamilton Memorial Award to Martha Burns
2004 - Leonardo da Vinci Award for creativity & innovation in the arts, to Albert Schultz
2003 - Salute to the City Award, for outstanding contribution to the cultural life of Toronto, to Albert Schultz
2002 - Queen Elizabeth II Golden Jubilee Medal, for outstanding contributions to the community, to Albert Schultz
2002 - Arts and Letters Club Award to Susan Coyne & Albert Schultz, recognizing worthy members of the artistic community
2001 - Joan Chalmers National Award for Artistic Direction, to Albert Schultz
1999, 2001, 2002, 2003 - Lieutenant Governor's Awards for the Arts, recognizing achievement in fundraising
1999 - Mayor Mel and Marilyn's Youth Award, for mentoring emerging artists or youth

See also
Soulpepper Theatre Company production history

References

External links
 Soulpepper Theatre Company official site
 Soulpepper Theatre Company at the Canadian Theatre Encyclopedia

Theatre companies in Toronto
Organizations established in 1998